José Luis Díaz (born 28 July 1974) is an Argentinian former professional footballer.

Club career
In 1996, Diaz migrated to Chile and has spent the majority of his career playing in that country. However, he did spend one season playing with the Chinese team Tianjin Teda before returning to Cobreloa. After spending time with several different teams, Díaz found success with Cobreloa in Apertura 2007, scoring 15 goals.

Honours

Club
Cobreloa
 Primera División de Chile (3): 2003 Apertura, 2003 Clausura, 2004 Clausura

External links
 Jose Luis Díaz – Argentine Primera Statistics at Fútbol XXI  
 
 

1974 births
Living people
Argentine footballers
Argentine expatriate footballers
Chilean Primera División players
Peruvian Primera División players
Textil Mandiyú footballers
Unión Española footballers
Club Deportivo Universidad Católica footballers
Cobreloa footballers
Nueva Chicago footballers
Club Deportivo Universidad de San Martín de Porres players
Tianjin Jinmen Tiger F.C. players
Chinese Super League players
Provincial Osorno footballers
Argentine expatriate sportspeople in Chile
Argentine expatriate sportspeople in China
Expatriate footballers in China
Expatriate footballers in Chile
Expatriate footballers in Peru
Association football midfielders
Argentine expatriate sportspeople in Peru
Footballers from Buenos Aires